

Theodor Bohlmann-Combrinck (18 November 1891 – 18 November 1956) was a general in the Wehrmacht of Nazi Germany during World War II.  He was a recipient of the Knight's Cross of the Iron Cross.

Awards

 Knight's Cross of the Iron Cross on 8 August 1941 as Oberst and commander of Schützen-Regiment 111

References

Citations

Bibliography

 

1891 births
1956 deaths
People from Delmenhorst
Major generals of the German Army (Wehrmacht)
German Army personnel of World War I
Recipients of the clasp to the Iron Cross, 1st class
Recipients of the Knight's Cross of the Iron Cross
German prisoners of war in World War II
People from the Grand Duchy of Oldenburg
Military personnel from Lower Saxony